Pic des Singes (or Monkey Peak) is a peak in northern Algeria, northwest of the town of Béjaïa. It is located in the Cap Carbon area of the Tell Atlas range, on the Mediterranean coast.

Ecology
This mountain is a habitat for the endangered primate Barbary macaque. Macaca sylvanus. This primate species is the only surviving species in Africa of its genus. Barbary macaques prehistorically had a much wider distribution than at present.

References
 C. Michael Hogan (2008) Barbary Macaque: Macaca sylvanus, Globaltwitcher.com, ed. Nicklas Stromberg
 Lara Modolo, Walter Salzburger and Robert D. Martin (2005) Phylogeography of Barbary macaques (Macaca sylvanus) and the origin of the Gibraltar colony

Line notes

Mountains of Algeria